Richard Feagler (July 29, 1938 – July 1, 2018) was an American journalist, playwright and television personality from Cleveland, Ohio. After attending Ohio University, he entered journalism in 1963, writing obituaries for the Cleveland Press. In 1970 Feagler started a regular feature column that continued until the Press closed in 1982.

Career biography, credentials 
Feagler continued to write his column for numerous Ohio newspapers, including the Akron Beacon Journal, the Willoughby News-Herald and the Elyria Chronicle-Telegram. The Plain Dealer began running the column in 1993. Feagler provided regular news commentaries for WKYC-TV and WEWS-TV, and hosted the talk show, Feagler! during a brief stint co-anchoring TV-3’s evening newscasts from 1991 to 1993. He was the host of Feagler & Friends, a weekly half-hour discussion program on WVIZ until 2013.

Feagler retired from The Plain Dealer with his last column published on Sunday, January 4, 2009. He retired from WVIZ in September 2013.

He died July 1, 2018 in Cleveland, Ohio.

Awards and honors
Feagler received the Peabody Award (1991), the DuPont-Columbia Award (1991), 23 local Emmy Awards and awards from United Press International and the Associated Press. Feagler was inducted into the Press Club of Cleveland Journalism Hall of Fame in 1994.

One of Feagler’s most popular newspaper pieces, "Christmas at Aunt Ida’s" was adapted into a stage production in 2006 at the Huntington Playhouse in Bay Village, Ohio. The play returned again in November 2007.

Many of Feagler’s favorite columns have been published as collections, including "Feagler's Cleveland" and "Did You Read Feagler Today?"

Bibliography 
Feagler’s Cleveland  (1996)
“Did You Read Feagler Today?” (1998)
“I know I’m not supposed to say this . . . But I’ll say it anyway" (2001)
Is it Just Me? (2005)

References

External links

Queer high for a straight guy 
Plain Dealer column archive
Feagler & Friends
Feagler, Dick. "Christmas at Aunt Ida's." 1993. Rpt. 21 Dec. 2007.

1938 births
2018 deaths
American columnists
People from Bay Village, Ohio
Television anchors from Cleveland
Ohio University alumni
Writers from Cleveland
Journalists from Ohio